Varenkamp is a surname. Notable people with the surname include:

Ines Varenkamp (born 1963), German former professional racing cyclist
Rusty Varenkamp (born 1976), American Christian musician